Thomas Louis Villard (November 19, 1953 – November 14, 1994) was an American actor. He is known for his leading role in the 1980s series We Got It Made, as well as roles in feature films Grease 2, One Crazy Summer, Heartbreak Ridge, My Girl, and Popcorn.

Early life
Villard was born in Waipahu, Hawaii and grew up in Spencerport, New York, the son of Diane Ruth (MacNaughton), a teacher for students with emotional challenges, and Ronald Louis Villard, a photochemical engineer. He attended Allegheny College in Meadville, Pennsylvania, before moving to New York City to attend the Lee Strasberg Theatre and Film Institute and the American Musical and Dramatic Academy in the early 1970s. In 1980, Villard moved to Los Angeles and soon started landing roles on television and in movies. He also continued performing on stage until the end of his career.

Career

Villard appeared throughout his career on television, in feature films, and on stage around the country. He was featured in situation comedies, episodic TV series, and had leading roles in lower and mid-range budgeted features. At the peak of his career Villard was given featured supporting roles in big-budget studio fare, such as Clint Eastwood's  Heartbreak Ridge, and My Girl (with Dan Aykroyd and Jamie Lee Curtis). One of his final roles was playing a Bajoran monk on Star Trek: Deep Space Nine.

Personal life and illness

Toward the end of his life, Villard became one of the few actors in Hollywood in the early 1990s who chose to be open about his homosexuality, and the challenge of living with HIV and AIDS. In February 1994, Villard made an unprecedented appearance on Entertainment Tonight, acknowledging to "...more than 13 million viewers that he was gay, that he had AIDS, and that he needed some help."

According to a POZ magazine profile in December of that year Villard said, "An awful lot of people suddenly wouldn't let me in the door for auditions. I started speaking a couple of months ago about living with AIDS and having hope," he said. "It feels a little more useful than things (I've done) in the past." He went on to explain that since his appearance on E.T., a whole other group of people had come forward to welcome him. Bill Melamed, Villard's manager added:  "I'm particularly proud of him. The reality is, acting is a lousy business... He made a decision that was courageous in any walk of life, but it doesn't surprise me. He has one of the most open spirits."

Death
On November 14, 1994, five days shy of his 41st birthday, Villard died of AIDS-related pneumonia.

As a tribute to him, a non-profit foundation was created by his partner Chambliss, close friend Caren Kaye, and his friend and chiropractor Cheryl Revkin. The Tom Villard Foundation was a Silver Lake community-based effort which engaged local businesses to provide free goods and services for community members living with AIDS. The beneficiaries were the client base of the former Silver Lake AIDS support organization, Being Alive. The Tom Villard Foundation no longer exists. Being Alive is now headquartered in West Hollywood.

Filmography

References

External links
 
 

1953 births
1994 deaths
20th-century American male actors
Male actors from New York (state)
AIDS-related deaths in California
Allegheny College alumni
American male film actors
American male stage actors
American male television actors
Deaths from pneumonia in California
American gay actors
20th-century American LGBT people
Lee Strasberg Theatre and Film Institute alumni
LGBT people from Hawaii
People from Spencerport, New York
American Musical and Dramatic Academy alumni